Chicken fried bacon consists of bacon strips dredged in batter and deep fried, like chicken fried steak. It is an American dish that was introduced in Texas in the early 1990s. Frank Sodolak of Sodolak's Original Country Inn in Snook, Texas, states that he invented the dish; however, there is a similar recipe in the 1954 cookbook Louisiana Cookery by Mary Land (not the state) which uses salt pork instead of bacon. It is usually served as an appetizer with cream gravy or sausage gravy for dipping and sauce.

Notoriety
Sodolak's version of the dish acquired enough of a reputation to be featured in Texas comedian John Kelso's Texas Curiosities. The entry states that "Things are not only bigger in Texas, they're greasier" and that "it's hard to imagine a more artery-clogging food."

Sodolak's version serves six strips of bacon, battered and fried, with a bowl of cream gravy. He and his restaurant were featured on a Texas Country Reporter episode; the web video has been watched hundreds of thousands of times on YouTube.

Versions

Chicken fried bacon made by Glen Kusak of south Texas won the Big Tex Choice Award for Best Taste in the 2008 State Fair of Texas in Dallas. In recent years, the dish has made its way across America and it is served in Chicago at the Risque Cafe in Lake View. The Risque Cafe's version of "country-fried bacon" is served with white gravy and sells for $6. It is prepared using an egg wash, dredged in heavily peppered flour and deep fried in vegetable oil. The café's chef, Andrew Niemeyer, said he "played around with the idea" while a student of the Cooking and Hospitality Institute of Chicago (he graduated in 2005).

Health issues
Since the dish is rich in saturated fat, the majority of health experts who favor low-fat diets suggest consuming it in moderation or not at all. Sally Squires of The Washington Post acknowledged chicken fried bacon's appeal to the palate, but suggests moderation. Other experts note the dish's low nutritional benefits: "They've taken fat, they've double-coated it in fat, they've fried it in more fat, and then they've served it with a side order of fat." Jane Hurley, senior nutritionist at the Center for Science in the Public Interest in Washington, D.C., stated she's "never heard of anything worse."

See also

Bacon Explosion
Chicken fried steak
Chocolate-covered bacon
 List of deep fried foods

References

External links
Snook Texas roadfood video Texas County Reporter - Chicken Fried Bacon (YouTube)
Recipezaar - Chicken Fried Bacon with Cream Gravy

Bacon dishes
Deep fried foods
Texan cuisine
American pork dishes
Appetizers